Several units of measurement were historically used in Singapore to measure length, mass, and volume.  During 1968–1970, the metric system was adopted in Singapore. The metric system is used for most official purposes and only metric measures are permitted for trade. Despite these restrictions, fabric is still commonly sold by the square yard.

System during the later half of the 19th century

Several units were used in Singapore under Straits Settlements.

Length units
1 cubit (aka. hasta) = 18 inches which is equal to 45.72 cm.

Mass units
1 mace (aka. miam) = 52 grain equal to 3.36954 grams.
1 buncal (for gold) = 822 grain equal to 53.2647 grams.

References

Singaporean culture
Singapore